Seventh-seeded Ágnes Szávay successfully defended her title, winning 6–2, 6–4, against Patty Schnyder in the final.

Seeds

Draw

Finals

Top half

Bottom half

References
Main draw
Qualifying draw

GDF SUEZ Grand Prix - Singles
GDF SUEZ Grand Prix - Singles
Budapest Grand Prix